Laura Sallés López (born 15 February 1986) is a judoka from Andorra. She has participated in several World Championships and has won several medals at the Games of Small States. Sallés participated in the 2016 Summer Olympics, where she was the flag bearer for her country. In the Women's 63 kg she lost to Katharina Haecker in the first round.

References

External links 
 

1986 births
Living people
Andorran female judoka
Judoka at the 2016 Summer Olympics
Olympic judoka of Andorra
European Games competitors for Andorra
Judoka at the 2015 European Games